Monanthes muralis is a species in the genus Monanthes, forming small, succulent bushes with green flowers.

The Latin specific epithet muralis is derived from the Latin word meaning 'growing on the wall'

References

 T. H. M. Mes, G.-J. Wijer, and H. ‘t Hart, "Phylogenetic relationships in Monanthes (Crassulaceae) based on morphological, chloroplast and nuclear DNA variation", J. evol. biol. IO (1997) 193-216.

External links
 Flora de Canarias entry
 JSTOR entry
 Freiburger Kakteenfreunde entry

muralis
Flora of the Canary Islands